Der Klassiker in German (The Classic), also known as the "German Clásico", is the name given in football to any match between Borussia Dortmund and Bayern Munich. They are two of the most successful teams in German football, having won a combined total of 25 of the past 29 Bundesliga titles as of 2022. The two teams fought closely for the Bundesliga title in the early 2010s, and met in the 2013 UEFA Champions League final.

However, the nature of the rivalry has been called into question, with many disputing the fixture being a "classic" due to there being little historic rivalry between the teams, in contrast to the long history of many other prominent football derbies in Germany, including Dortmund's Revierderby with FC Schalke 04, the various Bavarian football derbies involving Bayern Munich and 1. FC Nürnberg, and the elder 70s rivalry between Bayern Munich and Borussia Mönchengladbach.

History

First meeting and mutual successes
The first match between the two clubs was a 2–0 win for Dortmund in Munich on 16 October 1965.

On 5 May 1966, Dortmund won the 1965–66 European Cup Winners' Cup 2–1 against Liverpool in extra time, becoming the first German club to win a European title. Bayern Munich won the same competition the following season.

In 1971, Bayern defeated Dortmund 11–1; this remain's Bayern's biggest Bundesliga victory and Dortmund's second worst defeat. (NB: Dortmund's worst defeat was a 12–0 vs. Borussia Mönchengladbach on 29 April 1978)

On the other hand, the highest scoring draw in a Bundesliga match between the two teams occurred on 21 May 1983, when Karl-Heinz Rummenigge scored a late equaliser to save Bayern from a defeat against hosts Dortmund, with a final scoreline of 4–4.

The feud begins
The rivalry between the clubs grew during the 1990s, as Dortmund's stature increased to challenge perennial title favourites Bayern, winning two Bundesliga titles in 1994–95 and 1995–96.

In 1996, Bayern captain Lothar Matthäus accused Germany teammate Andreas Möller of being a 'crybaby', wiping imaginary tears from his face; Möller reacted by slapping Matthäus. At the end of that season, Dortmund won the 1997 UEFA Champions League final which happened to be played at the Olympiastadion, Bayern's home ground.

The teams met in the quarter-finals of the next edition of the Champions League, and Dortmund prevailed over two legs thanks to a single goal from Stéphane Chapuisat. That summer, Bayern hired Dortmund's successful coach Ottmar Hitzfeld to work for them. Tempers flared twice during Bayern and Dortmund's second meeting in the 1998–99 Bundesliga, as Bayern goalkeeper Oliver Kahn first attempted a flying kung-fu kick at Chapuisat, and later appeared to bite Heiko Herrlich's ear.

In the early 2000s both clubs remained successful, as Bayern lost one Champions League final (1999) then won another (2001) in addition to more domestic success, while Dortmund won the 2001–02 Bundesliga and reached the UEFA Cup final the same year. An angry 2001 league meeting between the pair was notable for 10 yellow cards and three red being shown (a Bundesliga record for indiscipline). However, Dortmund soon fell heavily into debt, and a €2m loan from Bayern in 2004 was a major reason for them being saved from bankruptcy. 

On 19 April 2008, the two sides clashed in the 2008 DFB-Pokal Final for the first time that took place in Berlin. Luca Toni opened the scoring on 11 minutes, but Mladen Petric drew BVB level in stoppage time, forcing 30 additional minutes. The Italian completed his double in extra time, thus lifting Bayern to cup glory.

Dortmund revival
By 2010, Dortmund had put together a strong squad, including Mats Hummels, Mario Götze, Shinji Kagawa and Robert Lewandowski, who led the club to the 2011 and 2012 Bundesliga titles; it was the first time any club other than Bayern won back-to-back championships since Dortmund in the mid-1990s. Dortmund clinched the 2011–12 league championship in a home match where bananas were tossed at Bayern goalkeeper Manuel Neuer. Dortmund then claimed the first double of their history by beating Bayern 5–2 in the 2012 DFB-Pokal Final with a Lewandowski hat-trick, which was also their fifth consecutive win over the opponents.

Champions League final at Wembley

After seeing two league championships heading to Dortmund and losing the 2012 UEFA Champions League final to Chelsea at their own Allianz Arena, Bayern recovered to clinch the 2012–13 Bundesliga in record time, breaking Dortmund's points record which had been set the year before. At the end of that season, the rivals met in the Champions League final. The German clubs had eliminated two rivaling Spanish contenders, Real Madrid and Barcelona, leading to the term "German Clasico" term first being used at that time, based on the El Clásico between those two Spanish clubs. The game was also notable for the fact that Dortmund's Mario Götze had already agreed to join Bayern in the coming weeks (although he did not play in the final due to injury).

In the first all-German European final, Arjen Robben scored a dramatic 89th-minute winner at Wembley. Bayern would wrap up the first Treble in their history a week later in the 2013 DFB-Pokal Final.

Domestic finals and player moves
Following the biggest match involving the teams, several domestic finals were played between them in quick succession. In the 2014 DFB-Pokal Final on 17 May 2014, Bayern managed to score two goals in extra time, thus achieving their 17th win in the competition. After that, both clubs met again in the 2014 DFL-Supercup at Dortmund's Signal Iduna Park, featuring Robert Lewandowski who had just moved to Bayern as a free agent after his contract with Dortmund ended. The match ended 2–0 to Dortmund.

Two years later, the 2016 DFB-Pokal Final was the last match in Dortmund shirt for their captain Mats Hummels before he also moved to Bayern, where his career had begun; Bayern won the trophy on penalties after a 0–0 draw. They clashed again in the 2016 DFL-Supercup after Bayern secured a double, Dortmund being runners-up in the league as well as beaten cup finalists; the Bavarians won that match 2–0. The 2017 DFL-Supercup featured the same teams (champions Bayern and cup holders Dortmund) and the same outcome, this time Bayern winning on penalties after a 2–2 draw. In March 2018, Bayern secured a 6–0 home win over Dortmund in the league, the largest margin of victory for either side since the 11–1 result 47 years earlier. The most important recent result has seen Bayern Munich defeat Borussia Dortmund by a score of 3–1 in the 2021 DFL-Supercup.

Results history

Bundesliga
{|
|valign="top" width=50%|

DFB-Pokal

DFB-Ligapokal

DFB/DFL-Supercup

UEFA Champions League

Overall match statistics
Table correct as of 8 October 2022.

Biggest wins
Bayern Munich: 11–1, 27 November 1971
Borussia Dortmund: 4–0, 6 March 1967

Head-to-head ranking in Bundesliga (1964–2022)

• Total: Bayern Munich with 44 higher finishes, Borussia Dortmund with 9 (as of the end of the 2021–22 season).

Honours

Table correct as of 30 July 2022.

See also
 Major football rivalries
 Sports rivalry

References

External links
Bundesliga.com- Der Klassiker
Fifa.com- Der Klassiker history

FC Bayern Munich
Borussia Dortmund
Association football rivalries in Germany
1965 establishments in West Germany
Nicknamed sporting events